Dentectus barbarmatus is the only species of the monotypic genus Dentectus, a genus of armored catfish.

This species is endemic to Venezuela where it is found in the upper Orinoco drainage. There is very little ecological and behavioral information on this species.

This species reaches  SL. Although it has been placed within the Pseudohemiodon group based on its strongly depressed body, filamentous lips with long fringed barbels, and small, spoon-shaped and dentition, Dentectus also shows unique derived features such as the presence of plates along the outer margin of its maxillary barbels, and a unique mouth structure that distinguishes it from all other genera.

References

Loricariini
Fish of Venezuela
Endemic fauna of Venezuela
Taxa named by Isaäc J. H. Isbrücker
Taxa named by Han Nijssen
Monotypic freshwater fish genera
Catfish genera